Daniel Jacobson may refer to:

 Dan Jacobson (1929–2014), South African writer
 Daniel P. Jacobson (born 1961), American politician in New Jersey